Ljuva sextital is a song written by Benny Andersson, Stig "Stikkan" Anderson and Björn Ulvaeus, and originally recorded by Brita Borg, released it as a 1969 single with the song Jan Öiwind Swahn acting as B-side, and Sven-Olof Walldoff's band acting as musicians. With her recording, Brita Borg scored a Svensktoppen hit for 20 weeks between 1 June-12 October 1969, peaking at second position.

Sven-Olof Walldoff's Band also recorded an own version, on their 1972 studio album Säj det med en sång.

Song lyrics describe the 1960s, which was soon about to end when the song was recorded, as well as watching forwards to circa 1990. Despite being released before the first Moon landing (July 1969) the song lyrics include references to the Moonflights, who were planned as the Space Race was going on. (The Moon had been rounded by the United States with Apollo 8 spacecraft in December 1968, without landing).

References

1969 singles
Songs written by Benny Andersson and Björn Ulvaeus
Songs written by Stig Anderson
Swedish-language songs
1969 songs
Polar Music singles
Brita Borg songs